The 1932–33 season was the thirty-eighth season in which Dundee competed at a Scottish national level, playing in Division One, where they would finish in 15th place. Dundee would also compete in the Scottish Cup, where they were knocked out in the 3rd round by Motherwell.

Scottish Division One 

Statistics provided by Dee Archive.

League table

Scottish Cup 

Statistics provided by Dee Archive.

Player Statistics 
Statistics provided by Dee Archive

|}

See also 

 List of Dundee F.C. seasons

References

External links 

 1932-33 Dundee season on Fitbastats

Dundee F.C. seasons
Dundee